Worthy Book is a Malaysian coupon-book brand held by Worthy Media. It is based in Kuala Lumpur, Malaysia.

Worthy Book was released in September 2010 by Han Jia and Ken Kho. The voucher booklet offers discounts, perks on dining, entertainment, health, beauty services, and retail. Worthy Book is now serving a growing number of over 250 merchant brands in Malaysia. Some examples are Kenny Rogers, Guardian, The Body Shop, Zalora, SOTHYS, Sushi Tei, myTeksi and many more.

Its focus on corporate social responsibility from its initial stage has also received praise from non-governmental organizations such as National Kidney Foundation in Malaysia, SPCA Malaysia and AIESEC.

Since its incorporation, the story of Worthy Book has attracted media coverage such as BFM 89.9, the Sun (Malaysia), the Malay Mail, Bernama TV, The Star (Malaysia) and others.

History
Worthy Book was released by Han Jia and Ken Kho in September 2010. 
Han Jia is an Oxford University alumnus with a Masters of Engineering, Economics, and Management. Prior to the co-founding of Worthy Book, Han Jia had internships with various organizations such as Deloitte, Buro Happold, and Oxfordshire County Council.

Jia's achievement with Worthy Book won him a place in Prestige Top 40 under 40.

Alongside Han Jia is his brother and co-founder Ken Kho. Ken is a graduate from Imperial College London with a Masters in Engineering, Civil Engineering.

Ken served as Marketing & Communications Manager for 5 years at a leading Asia Pacific IT conglomerate, governing a re-seller network of over 400 across Malaysia, Thailand, Brunei, Singapore, and China before leaving his corporate job and founded Worthy Book with his brother Han Jia.

Office and team 
Worthy Book's office is located at 3rd Mile Square, Old Klang Road, Kuala Lumpur.

The team boasts a number of employees.

Nowadays, their coupon book can be found on the shelves of bookstores in Klang Valley such as Borders, Books Kinokuniya, MPH, Times Bookstore, Mynews.com and Popular. Worthy Book also distributes their voucher booklets via their online store, consumers can order the booklets, which will be delivered to them via Pos Laju.

In March 2015, Worthy Book partnered with 7-Eleven and started distributing their voucher booklets.

Business
Its business model is similar to that of magazines whereby merchants pay for advertisement and readers pay for subscription. 

The book is designed as a cross between a shopping directory guide, write-up reviews, and coupon offers. Each merchant brand is typically given a page of introductory description (price range, outlet addresses, editorial tips, “3 Must-Try” bestseller recommendations, and so on) along with a page of 4 or 5 offer coupons.

One of its key selling points to merchants is that unlike other print media, whose readers may only care to browse through the advertisements once, their readers see clients’ advertisements throughout the year in order to redeem the deals. Furthermore, their coupons are categorized according to malls for customers’ convenience.

In addition, Worthy Book allows for long-term marketing to garner supporters while online coupons bank on short-term marketing to gain a rise in sales. The coupons in Worthy Book are mostly valid for one year while online coupons will normally expire in three months.

From 2012 onwards, the team behind Worthy Book decided to produce dedicated versions of the voucher booklet publication series for targeted niche audiences such as F&B edition and Ladies edition. Its 2013 Ladies Edition received favorable rating by on Yahoo! News.

See also
Coupon
Voucher

References 

2010 establishments in Malaysia
Companies based in Kuala Lumpur
Malaysian companies established in 2010
Sales promotion
Marketing companies
Malaysian brands